Örsö is an island located in the Stockholm archipelago in Sweden.

The island is located south of Ljusterö and north of Värmdö. It neighbours popular island Grinda.

Islands of Österåker Municipality
Islands of the Stockholm archipelago